Marcel Berry (born August 28, 1997) is an American soccer player who plays as a defender for the Harrisburg Heat in the Major Arena Soccer League.

Career

College & Amateur
Berry played four years of college soccer at the College of William & Mary between 2015 and 2018.

While in college, Berry appeared in the NPSL in 2017 with Virginia Legacy 76, and the USL PDL in 2018 with Des Moines Menace.

Following college, Berry also played a single game for NPSL side Charlottesville Alliance.

Professional
In September 2019, Berry signed for NISA side Stumptown Athletic ahead of the league's inaugural season.

Berry joined the Major Arena Soccer League's Harrisburg Heat ahead of the 2019–20 season.

References

External links
 Profile at William & Mary College Athletics
 Stumptown Athletic profile

1997 births
Living people
American soccer players
Association football defenders
Soccer players from Virginia
William & Mary Tribe men's soccer players
Des Moines Menace players
Stumptown AC players
Harrisburg Heat (MASL) players
National Premier Soccer League players
USL League Two players
National Independent Soccer Association players
Sportspeople from Charlottesville, Virginia